The Club may refer to:

Film
 The Club (1980 film), a 1980 satirical film adapted from a play by David Williamson
 The Club (1981 film), by Kirk Wong
 The Club (1994 film), with Matthew Ferguson
 The Club (2015 film), a 2015 Chilean film

Music and radio
 The Club (radio show); see Rage (TV program)
 "The Club" (song), by The Grace from the album Graceful 4
 Perfecto Presents: The Club, an album by Paul Oakenfold
 "The Club", a song in In The Heights

Television
 The Club (Australian TV series), a 2002 Australian reality television series
 The Club (British TV series), a 2003 British reality television series
 The Club (2004 TV series), a 2004–2005 American reality television series that aired on SpikeTV
 The Club (2010 TV series), a 2010 American reality television series about the Chicago White Sox that aired on MLB Network
 The Club (Mexican TV series), a 2019 Mexican drama web television series
 The Club (Turkish TV series), a 2021 Turkish period drama series
 The Club, the original title of the unaired American television series, Members Only
 "The Club" (Frasier), an episode of the American sitcom Frasier originally aired in 1995

Video games
 The Club (video game), a third-person shooter game
 The Club (Nickelodeon), an online role-playing game

Other uses
 The Club (automotive), a steering wheel locking device
 The Club (book), a 2019 book by Leo Damrosch about the London group
 The Club (dining club), a London group of notables founded in 1764
 The Club (fine arts), a NYC-based membership group founded in 1949
 The Club (play), a 1977 play by David Williamson (see also Film)
 The Club (professional wrestling), a professional wrestling stable
 The Club (Trotskyist), a British political group

See also
 Club (disambiguation)